Chorthippus biguttulus, the bow-winged grasshopper, is one of the most common species of grasshopper found in the dry grassland of northern and central Europe. It is part of a group of species (biguttulus-group) that are very difficult to identify morphologically. Chorthippus biguttulus was previously classified (with C. brunneus and C. mollis) as a single species Stauroderus variabilis. The three species were distinguished using song characteristics.

Distribution 
The range of the bow-winged grasshopper extends from the Finland and Scandinavia in the north to the Alps and Pyrenees in the south, and goes well into Asia including Japan.

Physical appearance 
Males often have a red tip to the abdomen while females do not. They can be extremely variable in colour from green to black-brown to rose.

C. brunneus and C. bigguttulus are morphologically indistinguishable but will not mate due to difference in their calls.  If a proper call is produced while the two species are placed in proximity, mating will occur with fertile offspring resulting. This is thought to be the early stages of species divergence in progress.

References 

biguttulus
Orthoptera of Asia
Orthoptera of Europe
Orthoptera of Africa
Grasshoppers described in 1758
Taxa named by Carl Linnaeus